Zorndorf may refer to:

 Sarbinowo, Gmina Dębno, a Polish village formerly known as Zorndorf
 Battle of Zorndorf, fought there in 1758 between Prussia and Russia during the Seven Years' War